Chezal-Benoît is a commune in the Cher department in the Centre-Val de Loire region of France.

Geography
The commune shares its western border with the department of Indre.

Population

Sights
 The abbey church of St.Pierre, dating from the twelfth century.
 A windmill.
 Other buildings from the Benedictine abbey.

See also
Communes of the Cher department

References

Communes of Cher (department)